Marcel Noebels (born March 14, 1992) is a German professional ice hockey forward who currently plays for Eisbären Berlin of the Deutsche Eishockey Liga (DEL).

Playing career
He made his professional debut with the Krefeld Pinguine during the 2009–10 season.

Noebels was drafted by the Philadelphia Flyers in the 4th round, 118th overall, of the 2011 NHL Entry Draft. He was signed to an entry-level contract by the Flyers on July 18, 2011.

Noebels split the 2012–13 season between the Trenton Titans of the ECHL and the Adirondack Phantoms of the American Hockey League (AHL), and spent the entire 2013–14 season with the Phantoms. Assigned to the Reading Royals before the 2014–15 season, Noebels left the team shortly after reporting to Reading, and the Flyers placed him on unconditional waivers for the purposes of terminating his contract on October 10, 2014. On October 13 he signed with Eisbären Berlin.   He represented Germany at the 2018 IIHF World Championship.

Career statistics

Regular season and playoffs

International

Awards and honors

References

External links 

1992 births
Adirondack Phantoms players
Eisbären Berlin players
German ice hockey centres
Ice hockey players at the 2018 Winter Olympics
Krefeld Pinguine players
Living people
Medalists at the 2018 Winter Olympics
Olympic ice hockey players of Germany
Olympic medalists in ice hockey
Olympic silver medalists for Germany
People from Viersen (district)
Sportspeople from Düsseldorf (region)
Philadelphia Flyers draft picks
Seattle Thunderbirds players
Portland Winterhawks players
Trenton Titans players
Ice hockey players at the 2022 Winter Olympics